Thomas Gene Randall (born August 3, 1956) is a former professional American football offensive lineman who played in the National Football League for the Dallas Cowboys and Houston Oilers. He played college football at Iowa State University.

Early years
Randall attended Mason City High School, where he initially focused on playing basketball and set a school record with 21 rebounds in a game. That changed as a senior, when he became a starter and a two-way player, receiving All-state honors at offensive tackle.

He accepted a scholarship from Iowa State University, where he was coached by Earle Bruce. He became a starter at defensive tackle as a sophomore.

As a senior, he led all defensive lineman in tackles in the Big Eight Conference. He posted 50 solo tackles, 78 assisted tackles, 11 sacks, 4 batted down passes and one recovered fumble.

In 2011, he was inducted into the Cyclone Hall of Fame. In 1986, he was inducted into the Iowa High School Football Hall of Fame.

Professional career

Dallas Cowboys
Randall was selected by the Dallas Cowboys in the seventh round (194th overall) of the 1978 NFL Draft with the intention of converting him into an offensive lineman. As a rookie, he was a backup left guard and played on special teams, although he was affected with tonsilitis early in training camp. He played in Super Bowl XIII. In his second year he was considered one of the strongest players on the team, but was waived on August 27, 1979.

Houston Oilers
On August 28, 1979, the Houston Oilers claimed him off waivers and appeared in 13 games as a backup. On August 4, 1980, he walked out of training camp unhappy at being moved from guard to offensive tackle. He was released on August 13.

Minnesota Vikings
On August 15, 1980, he was claimed off waivers by the Minnesota Vikings. He was cut before the start of the season.

Personal life
He owns a real estate company.

References

External links
Cyclone Hall of Fame bio

1956 births
Living people
People from Mason City, Iowa
Players of American football from Iowa
Iowa State Cyclones football players
American football offensive linemen
Dallas Cowboys players
Houston Oilers players